Mesoflavibacter sabulilitoris is a Gram-negative, aerobic, rod-shaped, non-spore-forming and non-motile bacterium from the genus of Mesoflavibacter.

References

Flavobacteria
Bacteria described in 2014